David G. Hooker was Mayor of Milwaukee, Wisconsin.

Biography 
Hooker was born in Poultney, Vermont, reports have differed on the date. He graduated from Middlebury College and moved to Milwaukee in 1856. Later, he married Sarah P. Harris. They had three children before she died. In 1872, he married Julia Ashley. They also had three children. He would later become General Counsel of Northwestern Mutual Life Insurance Company. Hooker died of heart disease on March 6, 1888 in Jacksonville, Florida. He was buried at Forest Home Cemetery.

Political career 
Hooker was City Attorney of Milwaukee from 1867 to 1870. He was elected mayor in 1872 and served one term. Hooker was a Democrat.

References

External links 

The Political Graveyard

1830 births
1888 deaths
Mayors of Milwaukee
Wisconsin city attorneys
People from Poultney (town), Vermont
Middlebury College alumni
Wisconsin Democrats
19th-century American politicians
Burials in Wisconsin